Got to Get It! is an album by American jazz pianist Bobby Timmons recorded in 1967 and released on the Milestone label.

Reception
The Allmusic review by Jason Ankeny awarded the album 3 stars stating "Purists may blanch, but Bobby Timmons' Milestone label debut Got to Get It! is an otherwise incendiary soul-jazz date informed by an irresistible freewheeling wit, absent from the pianist's more conventionally noteworthy efforts".

Track listing
All compositions by Bobby Timmons except as indicated
 "If You Ain't Got It (I Got to Get It Somewhere)" (Tom McIntosh) - 3:14 
 "Up, Up and Away" (Jimmy Webb) - 4:06 
 "Travelin' Light" (Jimmy Mundy, Trummy Young, Johnny Mercer) - 5:06 
 "Come Sunday" (Duke Ellington) - 3:02 
 "One Down" - 4:42 
 "So Tired" - 2:54 
 "Here's That Rainy Day" (Johnny Burke, Jimmy Van Heusen) - 3:22 
 "Straight, No Chaser" (Thelonious Monk) - 6:04 
 "Booker's Bossa" (Walter Booker, Cedar Walton) - 5:02 
Recorded at Plaza Sound Studios, New York City on November 20 (tracks 1, 4 & 6), November 21 (tracks 2 & 8), and December 4 (tracks 3, 5, 7 & 9), 1967.

Personnel
Bobby Timmons - piano 
Jimmy Owens - trumpet, flugelhorn (tracks 1, 2, 4, 6 & 8)
Hubert Laws - flute (tracks 1, 2, 4, 6 & 8)
Joe Farrell, James Moody - flute, tenor saxophone (tracks 1, 2, 4, 6 & 8)
George Barrow - baritone saxophone 
Joe Beck (tracks 3, 5, 7 & 9), Howard Collins (tracks 2 & 8), Eric Gale (tracks 1, 4 & 6) - guitar
Ron Carter - bass 
Jimmy Cobb (tracks 2, 3, 5 & 7-9), Billy Higgins (tracks 1, 4 & 6) - drums
Tom McIntosh - arranger, conductor (tracks 1, 2, 4, 6 & 8)
Unidentified voices (tracks 1, 4 & 6)

References

Milestone Records albums
Bobby Timmons albums
1967 albums
Albums arranged by Tom McIntosh
Albums conducted by Tom McIntosh